The Florence Air & Missile Museum was an aviation museum previously located at the entrance to the Florence Regional Airport, in Florence, South Carolina.  The museum closed at the end of 1997.

The airport was originally known as Florence Army Airfield, or more simply as Florence Field, a World War II U.S. Army Air Corps / U.S. Army Air Forces training field for P-39 Airacobra and P-40 Warhawk pursuit aircraft and A-20 Havoc and A-26 Invader attack aircraft. Because of its former military connection and available runways, the military was able to fly in aircraft and leave them at the museum as they were retired from service.

The museum was founded by Thomas C. Griffin. After the war, he served as executive director of the Florence Airport.

During the 1950s, 1960s, 1970s and early 1980s, the museum built up a collection of World War II and Cold War era U.S. military aircraft and early 1950s/1960s military space hardware.  The museum was located along routes once frequented by travelers between the southeastern and northeastern United States and between Florence and Myrtle Beach, South Carolina, but once Interstate 95 was built, attendance declined.  The museum closed on 8 October 1997 and much of the collection transferred to the newly established Carolinas Aviation Museum in Charlotte, North Carolina.

Exhibits

Boeing NTB-47B Stratojet 50-0062
 Now on display at the Mighty Eighth Air Force Museum in Pooler, Georgia
Chance Vought Regulus I
 Now on display at the Carolinas Aviation Museum
Convair YF-102A Delta Dagger 53-1788
 Now on display at the Carolinas Aviation Museum
Douglas BTD-1 Destroyer 04959
 Undergoing restoration at Museum of Flight (formerly Hixson Museum of Flight, TN) at Richard B. Russell Airport, Rome, GA. Relocated from Elmira, New York, Sept, 2015.
Douglas MGR-1 Honest John
 Restored at the Carolinas Aviation Museum
Douglas MGR-1 Honest John
 Disassembled for restoration at the Carolinas Aviation Museum
Grumman C-1A Trader 136790
 Now displayed at the Grissom Air Museum at Grissom Air Reserve Base (former Grissom AFB), Indiana
Grumman F-11A Tiger 141790
 Previous gate guard aircraft at the former NAS Glynco, Georgia before transfer to Florence in 1974.  Now displayed at the Grissom Air Museum at Grissom Air Reserve Base, Indiana
 Fairchild C-119C Flying Boxcar 50-0128
 Now displayed near Pope Field on Reilly Rd at Sidewinder St - not the C-119 at nearby 82nd Airborne Division War Memorial Museum
Lockheed F-104B Starfighter 57-1301
 Now displayed at the Kansas Cosmosphere and Space Center, Hutchinson, Kansas
Lockheed NC-121K Constellation 141292
 This aircraft flew the final USN Constellation mission in 1982 with Tactical Electronic Warfare Squadron 33 (VAQ-33) from NAS Key West, Florida - Front 50' now in a private collection in Charlotte, North Carolina
Lockheed T-33A 53-6089 
 Now on display at the Darlington, South Carolina Airport
Martin RB-57A Canberra 52-1459
 Initially moved to National Warplane Museum, Genesco, New York; noted in Sep 2006 at the Wings of Eagles Discovery Center, Elmira, New York. Confirmed still at Elmira, Sep, 2022.
Martin TB-61C Matador missile
 Now in storage at the Carolinas Aviation Museum
McDonnell F-101F Voodoo 56-0243
 Now on display at the Carolinas Aviation Museum
Republic F-84F Thunderstreak 52-6553
 Moved to Drister Aviation and Space Museum, Amarillo, Texas, then to English Field Air & Space Museum, Tradewind Airport, Amarillo, Texas
Sikorsky HO4S Chickasaw 125506
 Now on display at Tyler, Texas
Sikorsky CH-34A Choctaw 55-4496
 Now on display at the Carolinas Aviation Museum
Waco CG-4 – Skeleton
 Current location unknown; is not the CG-15 skeleton in storage at the Carolinas Aviation Museum
Boeing KC-97G Stratofreighter 52-2624
 Parts were used by Don Creason to complete the KC-97G 52-0335, on display at the Carolinas Aviation Museum
Douglas A-26A Invader 64-17671
 Remanufactured from 44-35820; scrapped for parts
Douglas WB-66D Destroyer 53-0431
 Scrapped
Grumman HU-16 Albatross 51-7212
 Sold following museum closure.  Currently owned by Margaret S. Dewitt of Corpus Christi, Texas for restoration to flyable condition with civilian registration N10625
Martin SM-72 Titan I Ballistic Missile 61-4499 
 Scrapped
North American F-86H Sabre 52-5737
 Moved to Burlington Township Office Complex, Burlington, New Jersey
Northrop F-89J Scorpion 53-02646
 Moved to Friendship Park, Smithfield, Ohio
Piasecki CH-21B Workhorse 54-4003
 On display at the American Helicopter Museum and Education Center in West Chester, Pennsylvania
Ryan AQM-91A Firebee
Ryan Firebee Model G
F-101A Simulator
 In storage at the Carolinas Aviation Museum
T-28 Simulator
 In storage at the Carolinas Aviation Museum
Kaman HH-43A Huskie 58-1833
 Now on display at the Museum of Flight, Robins Air Force Base, Georgia
Boeing B-29 Superfortress "Sweet Eloise" (former "Miss Marilyn Gay") 44-70113
 Now on display at the main gate of Dobbins Air Reserve Base, Georgia

References

Defunct museums in the United States
Museums in Florence County, South Carolina
Aerospace museums in South Carolina
1997 disestablishments in South Carolina